Eburia haldemani is a species of long-horned beetle in the family Cerambycidae.  It is found in Central America and North America.

Eburia haldemani can be distinguished from the similar species Eburia quadrigeminata, the ivory marked beetle, by its lack of prominent spines at the apex of the elytra, and less elongated marks at the base of the elytra.

References

Eburia